Michael O'Connor may refer to:

Politicians 
 Michael O'Connor (Australian politician) (1865–1940), Australian politician
 Michael O'Connor (Wisconsin politician) (1856–1925), Wisconsin State Assemblyman
 Michael J. O'Connor (politician) (1928–2018), American politician in the state of South Dakota
 Michael P. O'Connor (politician) (1831–1881), U.S. Representative

Sportsmen 
 Michael O'Connor (baseball) (born 1980), Major League Baseball player
 Michael O'Connor (Canadian football) (born 1996), Canadian football quarterback
 Michael O'Connor (footballer, born 1960), Irish association footballer
 Michael O'Connor (footballer, born 1987), Northern Irish footballer for Salford City and Northern Ireland
 Michael O'Connor (footballer, born 1998), Irish association footballer
 Michael O'Connor (hurler) (born 1930), Irish hurler
 Michael O'Connor (rugby) (born 1960), Australian rugby union and rugby league player
 Michael O'Connor (swimmer) (born 1984), from Bermuda
 Michael O'Connor (water polo) (1900–1957), Irish water polo player

Others 
 Michael O'Connor (American bishop) (1810–1872), Catholic Bishop of Pittsburgh, U.S.A.
 Michael O'Connor (Australian bishop) (1829–1883), Roman Catholic Bishop of Ballarat
 Michael O'Connor (costume designer) (born 1965), English costume designer
 Michael O'Connor (priest) (born 1942), Dean of Auckland
 Michael O'Connor (union official), national secretary of the Australian Construction, Forestry, Maritime, Mining and Energy Union
 Michael J. O'Connor (animator) (1938–1992), American animator for The Simpsons
 Michael P. O'Connor (writer) (1896–1967), Irish doctor, writer and radio broadcaster
 Michael Patrick O'Connor (1950–2007), American linguist
 Mike O'Connor (journalist) (1946–2013), American journalist and correspondent for Mexico